Keratin 6B is a type II cytokeratin, one of a number of isoforms of keratin 6. It is found with keratin 16 and/or keratin 17 in the hair follicles, the filiform papillae of the tongue and the epithelial lining of oral mucosa and esophagus. This keratin 6 isoform is thought be less abundant than the closely related keratin 6A protein. Mutations in the gene encoding this protein have been associated with pachyonychia congenita, an inherited disorder of the epithelial tissues in which this keratin is expressed, particularly leading to structural abnormalities of the nails, the epidermis of the palms and soles, and oral epithelia.  Keratin 6B is associated with the PC-K6B subtype of pachyonychia congenita.

References

External links
  GeneReviews/NCBI/NIH/UW entry on Pachyonychia Congenita

Keratins